Peter Kirk Demmerle (September 6, 1953 – May 24, 2007) was an American football player. He played college football at the University of Notre Dame as a wide receiver and was a consensus first-team  

Demmerle was a member of the  national championship team of 1973 which defeated top-ranked Alabama in the Sugar Bowl. A year earlier, he scored Notre Dame's only touchdown in the Orange Bowl; he was selected in the thirteenth round of the 1975 NFL Draft by the San Diego Chargers.

Demmerle graduated from Fordham University School of Law and worked in the insurance practice group at LeBoeuf, Lamb, Greene & MacRae. He died in 2007 at age 53, after an eight-year battle with amyotrophic lateral sclerosis (ALS), better known as Lou Gehrig's disease.

References

External links
New Canaan Rams football – Peter Demmerle #23
Sports Reference – College football statistics 
Obituary

1953 births
2007 deaths
American football wide receivers
Notre Dame Fighting Irish football players
All-American college football players
20th-century American lawyers
Fordham University School of Law alumni
People from New Canaan, Connecticut
Players of American football from Connecticut
Deaths from motor neuron disease
Neurological disease deaths in Connecticut